Tochi or Tōchi may refer to:
 Tochi Valley, a fertile area in North Waziristan, Pakistan
 Gambila River, also called Tochi River,  in Bannu District, Khyber Pakhtunkhwa, Pakistan
 The Japanese name for Aesculus turbinata (Japanese horse-chestnut)
 Japanese destroyer Tochi, a Tachibana-class destroyer of the Imperial Japanese Navy during World War II, canceled in May 1945
 JDS Tochi (PF-16, PF-296), a Kusu-class patrol frigate of the Japan Maritime Self-Defense Force, formerly USS Albuquerque (PF-7)
 The Japanese name for Douchi, a type of fermented and salted black soybean

Surname 
 Brian Tochi (born 1963), American actor, screenwriter, film director and producer
 Hiroki Tōchi (born 1966), Japanese voice actor
 Iwuchukwu Amara Tochi (born 1985 or 1986), Nigerian national convicted of drug trafficking in Singapore

Given name 
 Princess Tōchi (born 648?), Japanese Imperial princess during the Asuka period
Tochi Onyebuchi (born 1987), Nigerian-American speculative fiction writer
 Tochi Raina (born 1965), Indian singer, best known as a playback singer in Hindi films